The Tippecanoe School Corporation administers 18 high schools, middle schools and elementary schools in Tippecanoe County, Indiana:

High schools
 Elston Community Education Center 
 McCutcheon High School 
 Harrison High School

Middle schools
 Battle Ground Middle School 
 East Tipp Middle School 
 Klondike Middle School 
 Southwestern Middle School 
 Wainwright Middle School 
 Wea Ridge Middle School

Elementary schools
 Battle Ground Elementary School 
 Burnett Creek Elementary School 
 Dayton Elementary School 
 Hershey Elementary School 
 James Cole Elementary School 
 Klondike Elementary School 
 Mayflower Mill Elementary School 
 Mintonye Elementary School 
 Wea Ridge Elementary School 
 Woodland Elementary School (19)

References

External links
 Tippecanoe School Corporation

Education in Tippecanoe County, Indiana
School districts in Indiana